Cyrtomenus is a genus of burrowing bugs in the family Cydnidae. There are about nine described species in Cyrtomenus.

Species
These nine species belong to the genus Cyrtomenus:
 Cyrtomenus bergi Froeschner
 Cyrtomenus ciliatus (Palisot, 1818)
 Cyrtomenus crassus Walker, 1867
 Cyrtomenus emarginatus Stal, 1862
 Cyrtomenus grossus Dallas
 Cyrtomenus marginalis
 Cyrtomenus mirabilis
 Cyrtomenus teter Spinola
 † Cyrtomenus concinnus Scudder, 1878

References

Further reading

External links

Cydnidae
Articles created by Qbugbot